Viburnum cotinifolium, the Indian wayfaring tree, is a species of flowering plant in the family Viburnaceae. It is a deciduous shrub native to the Himalayan region. Its fruit is regularly consumed by Asiatic black bears (Ursus thibetanus).

Subtaxa
The following varieties are accepted:
Viburnum cotinifolium var. cotinifolium
Viburnum cotinifolium var. lacei  – northern Pakistan to the western Himalayas
Viburnum cotinifolium var. wallichii  – Nepal

References

cotinifolium
Flora of Afghanistan
Flora of Pakistan
Flora of West Himalaya
Flora of Nepal
Flora of Tibet
Flora of East Himalaya
Flora of Assam (region)
Plants described in 1825